Elvedin Herić (born 9 February 1997) is a Bosnian professional footballer who plays as a midfielder for Albanian club KF Vllaznia Shkodër.

Club career
On 11 August 2021, he joined Vllaznia in Albania.

References

External links
Profile - ÖFB
Elvedin Herić at Sofascore

1997 births
Living people
Sportspeople from Augsburg
Footballers from Bavaria
Association football midfielders
Bosnia and Herzegovina footballers
Bosnia and Herzegovina youth international footballers
FK Sarajevo players
Kapfenberger SV players
NK Triglav Kranj players
FK Sloboda Tuzla players
KF Vllaznia Shkodër players
Premier League of Bosnia and Herzegovina players
2. Liga (Austria) players
Slovenian PrvaLiga players
Kategoria Superiore players
Bosnia and Herzegovina expatriate footballers
Expatriate footballers in Austria
Bosnia and Herzegovina expatriate sportspeople in Austria
Expatriate footballers in Slovenia
Bosnia and Herzegovina expatriate sportspeople in Slovenia
Expatriate footballers in Albania
Bosnia and Herzegovina expatriate sportspeople in Albania